Robert Leslie Chynoweth (born 7 June 1941) is an Australian politician. He was an Australian Labor Party member of the Australian House of Representatives from 1983 to 1990 and again from 1993 to 1996.

Chynoweth was born in Richmond, an inner suburb of Melbourne to a family of Cornish descent.
.

Chynoweth first entered federal parliament at the federal election of March 1983, as part of a landslide Labor win under the leadership of Bob Hawke. He was the Labor candidate for the seat of Flinders, based on the outer south eastern fringe of Melbourne. He defeated incumbent Liberal member Peter Reith. Only months earlier Labor had failed to win Flinders, with a different candidate, Rogan Ward, at a by-election held in December 1982. Ward did not become the candidate again due to dissatisfaction with his candidacy at the by-election.

Following a redistribution of electoral boundaries in 1984, Chynoweth opted to contest the seat of Dunkley. Dunkley was one of a number of new seats created as a consequence of the enlargement of parliament. The seat took in much of the urban area previously covered by Flinders, and was considered a safer bet for a Labor candidate than the redistributed Flinders. (Dunkley was created with a notional two-party margin of Labor 53.2% to Liberal 46.8%. Flinders had a notional post-redistribution two-party margin of Labor 50.7% to Liberal 49.3%.) Chynoweth won the seat of Dunkley at the 1984 federal election and was re-elected in 1987.

Chynoweth was defeated at the 1990 federal election as one of a number of Labor losses in Victoria at that election. However, he was to make a comeback to politics by winning back the seat of Dunkley at the 1993 federal election. He defeated Liberal MP Frank Ford, who had defeated him three years earlier.

A redistribution that took place ahead of the 1996 federal election transformed Dunkley from a marginal Labor seat into a seat with a notional Liberal majority. Chynoweth re-contested the redistributed Dunkley but lost to Liberal candidate Bruce Billson.

References

External links
 Biography for CHYNOWETH, Robert (Bob) Leslie

Living people
1941 births
Australian Labor Party members of the Parliament of Australia
Australian people of Cornish descent
Members of the Australian House of Representatives for Flinders
Members of the Australian House of Representatives for Dunkley
Members of the Australian House of Representatives
People from Richmond, Victoria
20th-century Australian politicians